Darksong is a Parallel universe fantasy novel by Isobelle Carmody. The sequel of Darkfall, it is the second book in the Legendsong Saga. Conceived and written while Carmody was living in Prague, it was published by Viking books in 2002, and Penguin in 2003. The third book in the trilogy is as yet unpublished.

References

External links

2002 Australian novels
Australian fantasy novels
Legendsong Saga